The sohal surgeonfish (Acanthurus sohal) or sohal tang, is an endemic from the Red Sea and Persian Gulf. A single record was reported in 2017 from the eastern Mediterranean Sea, a likely result of aquarium release. It can grow up to 16 in (40 cm) in the wild. It is a valued aquarium fish. Its striking blue and white horizontal stripes have made it for many the 'poster fish' for the Red Sea reef and Persian Gulf environment.

Like other tangs, the sohal tang is compressed laterally, making it extremely maneuverable and fast along the reef. It has a horizontal, blade-like spine along the base of its tail on both sides, which folds into the fish, pointing anteriorly towards the head.  During defense and aggression, tangs flick the spine at other fish or intruders, causing physical harm. The surgeonfish are named for this scalpel-like spine.

Its primary diet consists mostly of vegetable matter, but occasionally includes the flesh of other animals. Sohal tangs have been known to nip at clam mantles and soft large-polyp and small-polyp stony corals.

Its range includes all reef environments in the Red Sea, to 90 ft or deeper.  It is one of the most aggressive tangs, and combined with its large size for a tang, is a dominant fish along the Red Sea reef.

In the aquarium
This fish needs a lot of swimming space and is a constant grazer for marine macroalgae. Its innate dominant and aggressive nature suggest only a single specimen should be kept in each aquarium. If healthy, aquarium specimen should live up to 10–15 years.

Specimen selection 
Alertness, swimming behavior and breathing rate should be the main factors when choosing the ideal Sohal Tang. Smaller specimens ~3 inch or more should be considered as it is better able to adapt to the aquarium environment and diet. Specimen's color should not be considered an important factor when selecting appropriate specimen.

An ideal specimen should be alert and curious, constantly swimming, breathing should be constant and show sign of aggressiveness to other tankmates.

Disease prevention/care
An aquarium size of more than 180 gallons (700 ℓ), with strong water movement and ample liverock structures are preferred for this species, due to its constant roaming nature. Due to its aggressive nature, this species should be added to the aquarium last.

Initial purchase should be Freshwater Dipped and quarantine in a designated Quarantine Tank (QT), with similar/identical water parameter. It is suggested the Quarantine Tank water should be of lower salinity as this will eliminate most ectoparasites on the body of the fish. When specimen is fully quarantined, it then can be introduced to the display aquarium.

Sohal Tang's diet should consist primarily of Algae or vegetable matter. It has been suggested that "Sushi Nori" can be the main diet of this fish. Other than Algae, the diet should be supplemented with a variety of frozen Mysis shrimps or other similar food items.

They are a constant grazer which will scrap off marine algae in the aquarium. It is therefore recommended that it be fed several times each day.

See also
Sohal tang care sheet at FishGeeks

References

External links
 

sohal surgeonfish
Fish of the Red Sea
sohal surgeonfish